Fernand-Jean-Joseph Thiry (born 28 Sep 1884 in Anor) was a French clergyman and bishop for the Roman Catholic Diocese of Fukuoka. He was ordained in 1927. He was appointed in 1927. He died in 1930.

References

French Roman Catholic bishops
1884 births
1930 deaths
Date of death missing